An instrumental is a musical composition or recording without vocals.

Instrumental(s) may also refer to:

Music
 "Instrumental" (My Bloody Valentine song), 1988
 "Instrumental", an instrumental by Faith No More from Who Cares a Lot?, 1998
 "Instrumental", the name of two songs from the Microphones' The Glow Pt. 2, 2001

Albums
 Instrumentals (Adrianne Lenker album), 2020
 Instrumentals (Mouse on Mars album), 1997
 Instrumentals (Nels Cline Singers album), 2002
 Instrumentals (The Pharcyde album), 2005
 Instrumentals (Ricky Skaggs and Kentucky Thunder album), 2006
 Instrumentals (mixtape), by Clams Casino, 2011
 Instrumentals, by Lil Rob, 2005
 Instrumentals Vol. 1, by Necro, 2001

Other uses
 Instrumental case, a grammatical case
 Instrumental value, one of two poles of an ancient dichotomy
 Instrumental variable, in statistics

See also
 Instrumental Album: The Rising Tied, a 2005 album by Fort Minor
 Instrumental Collection: The Shrapnel Years, a 2006 album by Richie Kotzen
 The Instrumentals (disambiguation)
 Instrumentality (disambiguation)